Northern Low Saxon (in High German: ,) is a subgroup of Low Saxon dialects of Low German. As such, it covers a great part of the West Low German-speaking areas of northern Germany, with the exception of the border regions where Eastphalian and Westphalian are spoken, and Gronings dialect in the Netherlands.

Dialects
Northern Low Saxon can be divided into Holsteinian, Schleswigian, East Frisian Low Saxon, Dithmarsch, North Hanoveranian, Emslandish, and Oldenburgish in Germany, with additional dialects in the Netherlands such as Gronings.

 is spoken in Holstein, the southern part of Schleswig-Holstein in Germany, in Dithmarschen, around Neumünster, Rendsburg, Kiel and Lübeck.

 is spoken in Schleswig, which is divided between Germany and Denmark. It is mainly based on a South Jutlandic substrate. Therefore, it has some notable differences in pronunciation and grammar with its southern neighbour dialects. The dialects on the west coast of Schleswig (Nordfriesland district) and some islands show some North Frisian influences.

 is spoken around the city of Oldenburg. It is limited to Germany. The main difference between it and East Frisian Low Saxon, which is spoken in the Frisian parts of Lower Saxony, is the lack of an East Frisian substrate. Oldenburgisch is spoken in the city of Bremen as "Bremian", which is the only capital where Oldenburgisch is spoken. Minden in Westphalia, where Oldenburgisch is not spoken, possibly borders to the area.

Characteristics
The most obvious common character in grammar is the forming of the perfect participle. It is formed without a prefix, as in all North Germanic languages,  as well as English and Frisian, but unlike standard German, Dutch and some dialects of Westphalian and Eastphalian Low Saxon:
gahn  (to go): Ik bün gahn  (I have gone/I went)
seilen  (to sail): He hett seilt  (He (has) sailed)
kopen  (to buy): Wi harrn köfft  (We had bought)
kamen  (to come): Ji sünd kamen  (You (all) have come/You came)
eten  (to eat): Se hebbt eten  (They have eaten/They ate)

The diminutive (-je) (Dutch and East Frisian Low Saxon -tje, Eastphalian -ke, High German -chen, Alemannic -le, li) is hardly used. Some examples are Buscherumpje, a fisherman's shirt, or lüttje, a diminutive of lütt, little. Instead the adjective lütt is used, e.g. dat lütte Huus, de lütte Deern, de lütte Jung.

There are a lot of special characteristics in the vocabulary, too, but they are shared partly with other languages and dialects, e.g.:
Personal pronouns: ik  (like Dutch ik), du  (like German Du), he   (like Dutch hij), se  (like Dutch zij), dat  (Dutch dat), wi , ji  (similar to English ye, Dutch jij), se .
Interrogatives (English/High German): wo , woans  (how/wie), wo laat  (how late/wie spät), wokeen  (who/wer), woneem  (where/wo), wokeen sien  / wen sien  (whose/wessen)
Adverbs (English/High German): laat  (late/spät), gau  (fast/schnell), suutje  (slowly, carefully/langsam, vorsichtig, from Dutch zoetjes  ‘nice and easy’, adverbial diminutive of zoet  ‘sweet’), vigeliensch  (difficult, tricky/schwierig)
Prepositions (English/High German): bi  (by, at/bei), achter  (behind/hinter), vör  (before, in front of/vor), blangen  (beside, next to, alongside/neben), twüschen  (betwixt, between/zwischen), mang, mank  (among/unter)

See also 
 Languages of Germany
 Middle Low German

References

External links 
 Plattmakers' Northern Low Saxon dictionary

Dutch dialects
German dialects
Northern Low Saxon dialects
Low German